Daniel Carroll Digges served on the Maryland House of Delegates in 1849 and served twice as state's attorney for Prince George's County, Maryland.

He attended Georgetown University in the 1830s, where he was a founding member of the Philodemic Society.

In 1843, he purchased the Digges-Sasscer house in Upper Marlboro, Maryland.

References

Members of the Maryland House of Delegates
Year of birth missing
1860 deaths
People from Upper Marlboro, Maryland
Philodemic Society members